After Love (French: Après l'amour) is a 1924 play by the French writers Henri Duvernois and Pierre Wolff.

A 1926 translation under the title Embers was staged at the Henry Miller Theatre on Broadway with a cast that included Ilka Chase, Leonard Mudie and Laura Hope Crews.

Film adaptations
It has been turned into films on three occasions: a 1924 French silent film After Love directed by Maurice Champreux, a 1931 film When Love Is Over directed by Léonce Perret and 1948's After Love by Maurice Tourneur.

References

Bibliography
 Goble, Alan. The Complete Index to Literary Sources in Film. Walter de Gruyter, 1999.
 Mason, Hamilton. French Theatre in New York: A List of Plays, 1899-1939. Columbia University Press, 1940.

1924 plays
French plays adapted into films
Plays by Pierre Wolff